Carl Vaugoin (8 July 1873, Vienna – 10 June 1949, Krems/Donau) was an Austrian official and politician of the Christian Social Party. He served as Defense Minister in 15 Austrian cabinets from 1921 to 1933, from 1929 to 1930 also as Vice Chancellor of Austria, and as Chancellor of Austria for about two months in 1930.

Literature 
 Jedlicka, Ludwig: Ein Heer im Schatten der Parteien. Hermann Bohlaus Nachf, 1955, .
 Staudinger, Anton: Carl Vaugoins Bemühungen um Suprematie der Christlichsozialen in Österreich 1930–32. Dissertation, Wien 1965.
 Weissensteiner, Friedrich, Weinzierl, Erika (Hrsg.): Die österreichischen Bundeskanzler. Österreichischer Bundesverlag, Wien 1983, .

External links
 

1873 births
1949 deaths
20th-century Chancellors of Austria
Christian Social Party (Austria) politicians
Vice-Chancellors of Austria
Politicians from Vienna
People from Pinkafeld
People from Krems an der Donau
Austrian Ministers of Defence